Bordman is a surname. Notable people with the surname include:

 Andrew Bordman ( 1550–1639), English clergyman
 Gerald Bordman (1931–2011), American theatre historian
 Sam Bordman